Tauco, Taucu, Taotjo or Tauchu is a paste made from preserved fermented yellow soybeans in Chinese Indonesian and Malaysian cuisines. Tauco is made by boiling yellow soybeans, grinding them, mixing them with flour and fermenting them in order to make a soy paste. The soy paste is soaked in salt water and sun-dried for several weeks, furthering the fermentation process, until the color of the paste has turned yellow-reddish. Good tauco has a distinct aroma.  The sauce is also commonly used in other Indonesian cuisines traditions, such as Sundanese cuisine and Javanese cuisine. Taucu is generally used in cooking by Chinese Malaysian, Singaporean and Bruneian.

The sauce is often used as condiment and flavouring for stir fried dishes such as tahu tauco (tofu in tauco sauce), kakap tahu tausi (red snapper with tofu in soybean sauce), in soup such as swikee oh (frog legs in tauco soup) and pie oh (softshell turtle in tauco soup), or stir fried with kangkung (water spinach). Today the major production centre of tauco in Indonesia is in Cianjur in West Java, and Pekalongan in Central Java. While in Singapore, Indonesia, Malaysia and Brunei, the main commercial brands of taucu is Yeo Hiap Seng (Yeo's).

See also

 Douchi
 Yellow soybean paste
 Fermented bean paste
 List of fermented soy products
 Miso

References

Chinese condiments
Indonesian Chinese cuisine
Sundanese cuisine
Javanese cuisine
Indonesian condiments
Malaysian condiments
Fermented soy-based foods